Why Bonnie is an American indie rock band from Austin, Texas. Their musical style has been described as shoegaze-icana.

History
Why Bonnie started as the musical project of musician Blair Howerton. However, the project expanded into a four piece for their first release, an EP in 2018 titled In Water. The EP was dedicated to Howerton's brother Bristol. The band released their second EP the same year titled Nightgown. In February 2020, the band released their first single for their new label Fat Possum Records, “Voice Box”. Their third EP, sharing the name of the aforementioned single, was released in April 2020. 90 in November, the group's debut album, was released in August 2022.

References

Musical groups from Austin, Texas
American indie rock groups